The 2013 UFL Pre-Season Cup is the inaugural Filipino association football friendly tournament. It is composed of 14 United Football League teams from, 7 Division I and 7 Division II clubs, with the aim of getting the teams some competitive games going into the UFL Cup.
It also features the U-23 Azkals as their preparation for the upcoming 2013 Southeast Asian Games. Loyola declared as the cup winner by default against Global.

Format

The tournament begins with three groups of five teams playing round-robin. The two teams per group with the best record then move on.
Those six qualifying teams will then be split into two groups of three for the second group stage, which will also see round-robin play. From there, the top two teams of each group will be drawn into the semifinals, with pairings to be arranged at a later date.

First round
All times are in Philippine Standard Time (PST) – UTC+8.

Group A

Group B

The remaining matches for Group B was postponed due to weather condition and safety concerns as cited by the UFL official Facebook and Twitter account. However, the said matches was not played without further details and the cup proceed to the second round.

Group C

Second round

Group D

Group E

Knockout stage

Semi-finals

Third place playoff

Finals

Top goalscorers
The top scorers of the tournament are as follows:

Notes

References

Cup